Cain is the first son of Adam and Eve in the Bible.

Cain may also refer to:

People
 Cain (surname)
 Cain Madden (born 1996), American football player
 Cain Velasquez (born 1982), Mexican American mixed martial arts fighter and 2010 UFC Heavyweight Champion

Arts and entertainment

Fictional characters
 Cain, the decoy assassin in Robert Ludlum's The Bourne Identity
 Cain, the Green Planet mage from The King of Braves GaoGaiGar
 Cain, main antagonist from the 1990 film RoboCop 2
Cain and Abel (comics), most notably seen in The Sandman series and House of Mystery
 Cain C. Hargreaves, a character from Kaori Yuki's manga: Godchild 
Cain Dingle, Emmerdale character
 Cain Marko, name of the Marvel character Juggernaut
Cassandra Cain, name of the DC Comics character Batgirl
Ciaphas Cain, character from the Warhammer 40,000 universe
Cogliostro, born as Cain, brother and killer of Abel, a supporting character in Todd McFarlane's Spawn comic series
Commander Cain, of the Battlestar Pegasus in Battlestar Galactica
David Cain (character), father of the DC Comics character Batgirl/Cassandra Cain
 Strider Cain, a character from the Strider franchise; See Strider Hiryu

Other arts and entertainment
Cain (American band), an American Christian country band
Cain (Italian band), an Italian black metal band
Cain (novel), the final novel by Nobel Prize-winning author José Saramago
Cain (play), an 1821 play by Lord Byron
Cain (1918 film), a German silent film
Caín (film), a 1984 Colombian drama directed by Gustavo Nieto Roa

Other uses
Cain (software), network packet analyzing software
Conflict Archive on the Internet (CAIN), a website documenting the Northern Irish 'Troubles'
Mount Cain, Vancouver Island, British Columbia, Canada
Cain's Ballroom, a music venue in Tulsa, Oklahoma, US
 Cain, a cigar brand made by Oliva Cigar Co.

See also

Caine (disambiguation)
Cane (disambiguation)
Cayne (disambiguation)
Kain (disambiguation)
Kane (disambiguation)